The 1996 AFC Asian Cup Final was a football match which determined the winner of the 1996 AFC Asian Cup, the 11th edition of the AFC Asian Cup, a quadrennial tournament contested by the men's national teams of the member associations of the Asian Football Confederation.

Venue

The Sheikh Zayed Stadium (now known as the Zayed Sports City Stadium) in Abu Dhabi hosted the final. The 43,206-seat stadium was built in 1980. It was the main stadium of the 1996 Asian Cup, hosting 12 matches including the final.

Route to the final

Match

Summary

The game ended goalless, the UAE ended up losing on penalties.

Details

References

External links
 

Final
Saudi Arabia national football team matches
United Arab Emirates national football team matches
1996 in Emirati sport
1996
December 1996 sports events in Asia
Sports competitions in the United Arab Emirates
Association football matches in the United Arab Emirates